Valandaran (also Romanized as Valandarān; also known as Valyandoran) is a village in Peyghan Chayi Rural District, in the Central District of Kaleybar County, East Azerbaijan Province, Iran. At the 2006 census, its population was 170, in 34 families.

References 

Tageo

Populated places in Kaleybar County